Tyrian purple ( porphúra), also known as Phoenician red,  Phoenician purple, royal purple, imperial purple, or imperial dye, is a reddish-purple natural dye. The name Tyrian refers to Tyre, Lebanon. It is secreted by several species of predatory sea snails in the family Muricidae, rock snails originally known by the name 'Murex'. In ancient times, extracting this dye involved tens of thousands of snails and substantial labor, and as a result, the dye was highly valued. The colored compound is 6,6′-dibromoindigo.

History

Biological pigments were often difficult to acquire, and the details of their production were kept secret by the manufacturers. Tyrian purple is a pigment made from the mucus of several species of Murex snail. Production of Tyrian purple for use as a fabric dye began as early as 1200 BC by the Phoenicians, and was continued by the Greeks and Romans until 1453 AD, with the fall of Constantinople. In the same way as the modern day alphabet, the Phoenician purple pigment was spread through the unique Phoenician trade empire. The pigment was expensive and complex to produce, and items colored with it became associated with power and wealth. This popular idea of purple being so elite contributes to the modern day wide-spread belief that purple is a "royal color". The color of textiles from this period provides insight into socio-cultural relationships within ancient societies, in addition to providing insight to technological achievements, fashion, social stratification, agriculture and trade connections. Despite their value to archaeological research, textiles are rare in the archaeological record. Like any perishable organic material, they are usually subject to rapid decomposition and their preservation requires special conditions to prevent destruction by microorganisms.

Tyrian purple may first have been used by the ancient Phoenicians as early as 1570 BC. It has been suggested that the name Phoenicia itself means 'land of purple'. The dye was greatly prized in antiquity because the colour did not easily fade, but instead became brighter with weathering and sunlight. It came in various shades, the most prized being that of black-tinted clotted blood.

Because it was extremely difficult to make, Tyrian purple was expensive: the 4th century BC historian Theopompus reported, "Purple for dyes fetched its weight in silver at Colophon" in Asia Minor. The expense meant that purple-dyed textiles became status symbols, whose use was restricted by sumptuary laws. The most senior Roman magistrates wore a toga praetexta, a white toga edged with a stripe of Tyrian purple. The even more sumptuous toga picta, solid Tyrian purple with a gold stripe, was worn by generals celebrating a Roman triumph. 

By the fourth century AD, sumptuary laws in Rome had been tightened so much that only the Roman emperor was permitted to wear Tyrian purple. As a result, 'purple' is sometimes used as a metonym for the office (e.g. the phrase 'donned the purple' means 'became emperor'). The production of Tyrian purple was tightly controlled in the succeeding Byzantine Empire and subsidized by the imperial court, which restricted its use for the colouring of imperial silks. Later (9th century) a child born to a reigning emperor was said to be porphyrogenitos, "born in the purple".

Production from sea snails

The dye substance is a mucous secretion from the hypobranchial gland of one of several species of medium-sized predatory sea snails that are found in the eastern Mediterranean Sea, and off the Atlantic coast of Morocco. These are the marine gastropods Bolinus brandaris the spiny dye-murex (originally known as Murex brandaris Linnaeus, 1758), the banded dye-murex Hexaplex trunculus, the rock-shell Stramonita haemastoma, and less commonly a number of other species such as Bolinus cornutus. The dye is an organic compound of bromine (i.e., an organobromine compound), a class of compounds often found in algae and in some other sea life, but much more rarely found in the biology of land animals. This dye is in contrast to the cheaper imitation purple that was commonly produced using cheaper materials than the dyes from the sea snail.

In nature, the snails use the secretion as part of their predatory behavior to sedate prey and as an antimicrobial lining on egg masses. The snail also secretes this substance when it is attacked by predators, or physically antagonized by humans (e.g., poked). Therefore, the dye can be collected either by "milking" the snails, which is more labor-intensive but is a renewable resource, or by collecting and destructively crushing the snails. David Jacoby remarks that "twelve thousand snails of Murex brandaris yield no more than 1.4 g of pure dye, enough to colour only the trim of a single garment." Through the snail harvesting process which includes the extraction of the hypobranchial gland (located under the mollusk's mantle) the dye is collected which required advanced knowledge of biology. Murex-based dyeing must take place close to the site from which the snails originate, because the freshness of the material has a significant effect on the results, the colors yielded based on the long process of biochemical, enzymatic and photochemical reactions, and requires reduction and oxidation processes that probably took several days.

Many other species worldwide within the family Muricidae, for example Plicopurpura pansa, from the tropical eastern Pacific, and Plicopurpura patula from the Caribbean zone of the western Atlantic, can also produce a similar substance (which turns into an enduring purple dye when exposed to sunlight) and this ability has sometimes also been historically exploited by local inhabitants in the areas where these snails occur. (Some other predatory gastropods, such as some wentletraps in the family Epitoniidae, seem to also produce a similar substance, although this has not been studied or exploited commercially.) The dog whelk Nucella lapillus, from the North Atlantic, can also be used to produce red-purple and violet dyes.

Royal blue

The Phoenicians also made a deep blue-colored dye, sometimes referred to as royal blue or hyacinth purple, which was made from a closely related species of marine snail.

The Phoenicians established an ancillary production facility on the Iles Purpuraires at Mogador, in Morocco. The sea snail harvested at this western Moroccan dye production facility was Hexaplex trunculus also known by the older name Murex trunculus.

This second species of dye murex is found today on the Mediterranean and Atlantic coasts of Europe and Africa (Spain, Portugal, Morocco).

Background 

The colour-fast (non-fading) dye was an item of luxury trade, prized by Romans, who used it to colour ceremonial robes. Used as a dye, the color shifts from blue (peak absorption at 590 nm, which is yellow-orange) to reddish-purple (peak absorption at 520 nm, which is green). It is believed that the intensity of the purple hue improved rather than faded as the dyed cloth aged. Vitruvius mentions the production of Tyrian purple from shellfish. In his History of Animals, Aristotle described the shellfish from which Tyrian purple was obtained and the process of extracting the tissue that produced the dye. Pliny the Elder described the production of Tyrian purple in his Natural History:
The most favourable season for taking these [shellfish] is after the rising of the Dog-star, or else before spring; for when they have once discharged their waxy secretion, their juices have no consistency: this, however, is a fact unknown in the dyers' workshops, although it is a point of primary importance. After it is taken, the vein [i.e. hypobranchial gland] is extracted, which we have previously spoken of, to which it is requisite to add salt, a sextarius [about 20 fl. oz.] to every hundred pounds of juice. It is sufficient to leave them to steep for a period of three days, and no more, for the fresher they are, the greater virtue there is in the liquor. It is then set to boil in vessels of tin [or lead], and every hundred amphorae ought to be boiled down to five hundred pounds of dye, by the application of a moderate heat; for which purpose the vessel is placed at the end of a long funnel, which communicates with the furnace; while thus boiling, the liquor is skimmed from time to time, and with it the flesh, which necessarily adheres to the veins. About the tenth day, generally, the whole contents of the cauldron are in a liquefied state, upon which a fleece, from which the grease has been cleansed, is plunged into it by way of making trial; but until such time as the colour is found to satisfy the wishes of those preparing it, the liquor is still kept on the boil. The tint that inclines to red is looked upon as inferior to that which is of a blackish hue. The wool is left to lie in soak for five hours, and then, after carding it, it is thrown in again, until it has fully imbibed the colour.

Archaeological data from Tyre indicate that the snails were collected in large vats and left to decompose. This produced a hideous stench that was actually mentioned by ancient authors. Not much is known about the subsequent steps, and the actual ancient method for mass-producing the two murex dyes has not yet been successfully reconstructed; this special "blackish clotted blood" colour, which was prized above all others, is believed to be achieved by double-dipping the cloth, once in the indigo dye of H. trunculus and once in the purple-red dye of B. brandaris.

The Roman mythographer Julius Pollux, writing in the 2nd century CE, asserted (Onomasticon I, 45–49) that the purple dye was first discovered by the philosopher Heracles of Tyre, or rather, by his dog, whose mouth was stained purple from chewing on snails along the coast at Tyre. This story was depicted by Peter Paul Rubens in his painting Hercules' Dog Discovers Purple Dye. According to John Malalas, the incident happened during the reign of the legendary King Phoenix of Tyre, the eponymous progenitor of the Phoenicians, and therefore he was the first ruler to wear Tyrian purple and legislate on its use.

Recently, the archaeological discovery of substantial numbers of Murex shells on Crete suggests that the Minoans may have pioneered the extraction of Imperial purple centuries before the Tyrians. Dating from collocated pottery suggests the dye may have been produced during the Middle Minoan period in the 20th–18th century BC. Accumulations of crushed murex shells from a hut at the site of Coppa Nevigata in southern Italy may indicate production of purple dye there from at least the 18th century BCE. Additional archaeological evidence can be found from samples originating from excavations at the extensive Iron Age copper smelting site of “Slaves’ Hill” (Site 34), which is tightly dated by radiocarbon to the late 11th–early 10th centuries BC. Findings from this site include evidence of the use of purple dye found in stains used on pot shards. Evidence of the use of dye in pottery are found in most cases on the upper part of ceramic basins, on the inside surface, the areas in which the reduced dye-solution was exposed to air, and underwent oxidation that turned it purple.

The production of Murex purple for the Byzantine court came to an abrupt end with the sack of Constantinople in 1204, the critical episode of the Fourth Crusade. David Jacoby concludes that "no Byzantine emperor nor any Latin ruler in former Byzantine territories could muster the financial resources required for the pursuit of murex purple production. On the other hand, murex fishing and dyeing with genuine purple are attested for Egypt in the tenth to 13th centuries." By contrast, Jacoby finds that there are no mentions of purple fishing or dyeing, nor trade in the colorant in any Western source, even in the Frankish Levant. The European West turned instead to vermilion provided by the insect Kermes vermilio, known as grana, or crimson.

In 1909, Harvard anthropologist Zelia Nuttall compiled an intensive comparative study on the historical production of the purple dye produced from the carnivorous murex snail, source of the royal purple dye valued higher than gold in the ancient Near East and ancient Mexico.  Not only did the people of ancient Mexico use the same methods of production as the Phoenicians, they also valued murex-dyed cloth above all others, as it appeared in codices as the attire of nobility. "Nuttall noted that the Mexican murex-dyed cloth bore a "disagreeable … strong fishy smell, which appears to be as lasting as the color itself." Likewise, the ancient Egyptian Papyrus of Anastasi laments: "The hands of the dyer reek like rotting fish ..." So pervasive was this stench that the Talmud specifically granted women the right to divorce any husband who became a dyer after marriage.

In 2021, archaeologists found surviving wool fibers dyed with royal purple in the Timna Valley in Israel. The find, which was dated to c. 1000 BCE, constituted the first direct evidence of fabric dyed with the pigment from antiquity.

Murex purple production in North Africa 

Murex purple was a very important industry in many Phoenician territories and Carthage was no exception. Traces of this once very lucrative industry are still visible in many Punic sites such as Kerkouane, Zouchis, Djerba and even in Carthage itself. According to Pliny, Meninx (today's Djerba) produced the best purple in Africa which was also ranked second only after Tyre's. It was found also at Essaouira (Morocco). The Royal purple or Imperial purple was probably used until the time of Augustine of Hippo (354–430 CE) and before the demise of the Roman Empire.

Dye chemistry

Variations in colors of "Tyrian purple" from different snails are related to the presence of indigo dye (blue), 6-bromoindigo (purple), and the red 6,6′-dibromoindigo. Additional changes in color can be induced by debromination from light exposure (as is the case for Tekhelet) or by heat processing. The final shade of purple is decided by chromatogram, which can be idenfitied by HPLC analysis in a single measurement: indigotin (IND) and indirubin (INR). The two are found in plant sources such as woad (Isatis tinctoria L.) and the indigo plant (Indigofera tinctoria L), as well as in several species of shellfish.

In 1998, by means of a lengthy trial and error process, a process for dyeing with Tyrian purple was rediscovered. This finding built on reports from the 15th century to the 18th century and explored the biotechnology process behind woad fermentation. It is hypothesized that an alkaline fermenting vat was necessary. An incomplete ancient recipe for Tyrian purple recorded by Pliny the Elder was also consulted. By altering the percentage of sea salt in the dye vat and adding potash, he was able to successfully dye wool a deep purple colour.

Recent research in organic electronics has shown that Tyrian purple is an ambipolar organic semiconductor. Transistors and circuits based on this material can be produced from sublimed thin-films of the dye. The good semiconducting properties of the dye originate from strong intermolecular hydrogen bonding that reinforces pi stacking necessary for transport.

Modern hue rendering 
True Tyrian purple, like most high-chroma pigments, cannot be accurately rendered on a standard RGB computer monitor. Ancient reports are also not entirely consistent, but these swatches give a rough indication of the likely range in which it appeared.

_ 
_

The lower one is the sRGB colour #990024, intended for viewing on an output device with a gamma of 2.2 . It is a representation of RHS colour code 66A, which has been equated to "Tyrian red", a term which is often used as a synonym for Tyrian purple.

Philately
The colour name "Tyrian plum" is popularly given to a British postage stamp that was prepared, but never released to the public, shortly before the death of King Edward VII in 1910.

Gallery

See also

Explanatory notes

References

External links 
 
 
 
 
 

Animal dyes
Organic pigments
Mollusc products
Organobromides
Halogen-containing natural products
Shades of violet
Byzantine culture
Byzantine clothing
Bromine-containing natural products